In enzymology, a pinosylvin synthase is an enzyme that catalyzes the chemical reaction

3 malonyl-CoA + cinnamoyl-CoA  4 CoA + pinosylvin + 4 CO2

Thus, the two substrates of this enzyme are malonyl-CoA and cinnamoyl-CoA, whereas its 3 products are CoA, pinosylvin, and CO2.

This enzyme belongs to the family of transferases, specifically those acyltransferases transferring groups other than aminoacyl groups.  The systematic name of this enzyme class is malonyl-CoA:cinnamoyl-CoA malonyltransferase (cyclizing). Other names in common use include stilbene synthase, and pine stilbene synthase.  This enzyme participates in phenylpropanoid biosynthesis.

References 

EC 2.3.1
Enzymes of unknown structure
Stilbenoids metabolism